Bijoux may refer to:

 Bijoux Terner, a global chain of fashion retail stores
 Bijoux Falls Provincial Park, a small park in British Columbia, Canada
 Les Bijoux (comics), a Korean cartoon
 Bijoux, the name of the dog on the 1980s American television series Hooperman
 Les Bijoux, a 1997 short film by Khady Sylla
Les Bijoux (album), album by Sumi Jo
 "Bijoux", a song by Manitoba on the 2003 album Up in Flames
 Caroline Bijoux, a South African chess player

See also
 Bijou (disambiguation)